The Proud General is a Chinese animated featurette produced by Shanghai Animation Film Studio under the animator Te Wei.  It is also translated as The Conceited General.

Plot
After a victorious military campaign, a general returns home to glory and prosperity.  The king rewards him and claims that all enemies will be intimidated by the general.  From then on, the general no longer practices martial arts.  He eats, drinks, lives the glamorous life, and doesn't bother anymore with sharpening his weapons.  When the enemy one day returns, his own arrogance leads to his defeat and eventually to the downfall of the whole nation.

Creators

Production
The film was heavily influenced by Disney from the perspective of character design, movement and storytelling point of view.  The music is derived from the Beijing Opera.  The clothing, architecture, and props do have a strong sense of Chinese cultural influence.

DVD
The film has been re-released as part of the Chinese Classic Animation Te Wei Collection set.  The Conceited General does have English subtitles.

References

External links
 
 The Proud General at China's Movie Database

1956 films
Chinese animated films
1950s Mandarin-language films
Films directed by Te Wei
Animated featurettes